John Scarlet (18 August 1978 – 18 October 2010) was an Indonesian footballer who played as a defender for Liga Indonesia club Persipura Jayapura.

He was born in Merauke, Papua. He died in Merauke in 2010.

References

External links
 
 

Association football defenders
1978 births
2010 deaths
Indonesian footballers
Deltras F.C. players
Persela Lamongan players
Persipura Jayapura players
Liga 1 (Indonesia) players
Indonesian Premier Division players
Sportspeople from Papua